Sybil Ruscoe (born 8th August 1960, Shropshire, England) is a British radio and television presenter.

Ruscoe was born in Wem, Shropshire, and began her career on the Express & Star newspaper in Wolverhampton. She then moved to Radio Wyvern, Beacon Radio and BBC Radio Shropshire. She was teamed with Simon Mayo on Radio 1 Breakfast in 1988 and 89. She also started presenting television during this period, including Top of the Pops.

She was a presenter of Radio 1 Newsbeat and News 90, News 91, News 92 and News 93. In 1994, Ruscoe and John Inverdale were the first presenters hired by BBC Radio 5 Live. Ruscoe presented the afternoon show for five years.  In 1999, she joined the BAFTA and RTS award-winning Channel 4 Cricket.  She was the first woman to present cricket on TV, and was named a Cosmopolitan Inspirational Woman of the Year.  From 1999 to 2007, Ruscoe wrote a cricket column for the Daily Telegraph.

She is a regular presenter on Farming Today on BBC Radio 4.

Ruscoe co-wrote the Official Book of the London 2012 Olympic and Paralympic Games with her husband, Tom Knight, the former athletics correspondent of the Daily Telegraph.

Ruscoe is a supporter of Stoke City F.C.

In 2021, she was made an executive director of the Gloucestershire Cricket Board and a Deputy Lieutenant for Gloucestershire, and became farming and countryside advisor on The Archers.

References

External links 

1960 births
Living people
People from Wem
English journalists
English radio presenters
English radio DJs
Top of the Pops presenters